The Baptist Union of Papua New Guinea is a Baptist Christian denomination in Papua New Guinea. It is affiliated with the Baptist World Alliance. The headquarters is in Mount Hagen.

History
The Baptist Union of Papua New Guinea has its origins in a mission of the Australian Baptist Ministries in 1850.  It is officially founded in 1977.  According to a denomination census released in 2020, it claimed 489 churches and 84,000 members.

Schools
The convention has 40 primary schools gathered in the Baptist Education Agency. 

It has 2 affiliated theological institutes.

Health Services 
The convention has 3 hospitals.

See also
 Bible
 Born again
 Baptist beliefs
 Worship service (evangelicalism)
 Jesus Christ
 Believers' Church

References

External links
Official Website 	

Baptist denominations in Oceania
Evangelicalism in Papua New Guinea
1977 establishments in Papua New Guinea